Phreatoicidae is a family of blind, freshwater isopods. They have survived apparently unchanged for 350 million years, and are only found in South Africa, India, Australia and New Zealand. They were first found near Christchurch in 1882 by Charles Chilton. The family Phreatoicidae now contains 13 genera:

Colacanthotelson Nicholls, 1944
Colubotelson Nicholls, 1944
Crenoicus Nicholls, 1944
Gariwerdeus Wilson & Keable, 2002
Mesacanthotelson Nicholls, 1944
Metaphreatoicus Nicholls, 1944
Naiopegia Wilson & Keable, 2002
Neophreatoicus Nicholls, 1944
Notamphisopus Nicholls, 1944
Onchotelson Nicholls, 1944
Paraphreatoicus Nicholls, 1944
Phreatoicus Chilton, 1883
Uramphisopus Nicholls, 1943

References

External links

Isopoda
Crustacean families